Parkan in Iran may refer to:
 Parkan, Kerman
 Parkan, Yazd
 Parkan-e Al-e Musa
 Parkan-e Gishu

See also
 Purkan (disambiguation)